The 2016 New Brunswick Scotties Tournament of Hearts, the provincial women's curling championship of New Brunswick was held January 27 to 31 at Curl Moncton in Moncton.  The winning Sylvie Robichaud team represented New Brunswick at the 2016 Scotties Tournament of Hearts in Grande Prairie, Alberta.

Teams
The teams are listed as follows:

Round robin standings

Scores

January 27
Draw 1
Robichaud 8-4 Mallais
Tatlock 10-2 Graham

January 28
Draw 2
Robichaud 10-3 Graham
Adams 10-3 Mallais

Draw 3
Adams 11-3 Graham
Tatlock 8-7 Robichaud

January 29
Draw 4
Adams 8-4 Tatlock
Mallais 8-3 Graham

Draw 5
Mallais 8-3 Tatlock
Robichaud 9-8 Adams

Playoffs

1 vs 2
Saturday, January 30, 1:30 pm

3 vs 4
Saturday, January 30, 1:30 pm

Semifinal
Saturday, January 30, 6:30 pm

Final
Sunday, January 31, 12:30 pm

References

2016 Scotties Tournament of Hearts
Curling competitions in Moncton
2016 in New Brunswick